Bandanna Land (also known as In Bandanna Land) is a musical from 1908.  The book was written by Jesse A. Shipp, lyrics by  Alex Rogers (aka Alec) Rogers (né Alexander Claude Rogers; 1876–1930), and music composed primarily by Will Marion Cook.  Created by and featuring African Americans, it was the third musical written by the team whose previous works included In Dahomey (1902) and Abyssinia (1906). It was the last show featuring the duo of Bert Williams and George Walker, comedians who starred in these musicals. Walker became ill during the post-Broadway tour and died in 1911.

Plot
Skunkton Bowser, a performer who does one-night-stands with a minstrel show, inherits $25,000 as a bequest from his father's former owner.  His educated friend, Bud Jenkins, appoints himself as guardian of Bowser and creates a park for African Americans called "Bandanna Land". Jenkins assists in selling the park to a railroad company that does not like the presence of the African Americans. Despite Jenkins, Bowser is determined to receive his fair share of the profits of the sale.

Characters and original Broadway cast
Based on the cast list from IBDB. 

 Amos Simmons, owner of the property that all the fuss is about – Alex Rogers
 Cynthia, niece of Amos – Bertha Clarke
 Sophie Simmons, Amos's wife – Hattie McIntosh
 Dinah Simmons, Amos's daughter – Aida Overton Walker
 Pete Simmons, Amos's brother – Charles H. Moore
 Mandy Lou, a niece of Amos Simmons – Abbie Mitchell Cook (listed in Billboard review but not listed on IBDB)
 Julia Smothers, Dinah's schoolmate – Maggie Davis
 Sue Higgins, Dinah's schoolmate – Bessie Vaughan
 Amelia Green, Dinah's schoolmate – Bessie Brady
 Sis Black, a child – Marguerite Ward
 Babe Brown, Dinah's schoolmate – Ida Day (née Ida Daisy Day; 1879–1940)
 Becky White, a child – Katie Jones
 Angelina Diggs, teacher and president of the R.L.B.H. Society – Ada Rex
 Fountain Lewis, owner of the Carrolton Hotel barber shop – R. Henri Strange
 
 Mr. Wilson, a major shareholder – James E. Lightfoot
 Mr. Jones, a major shareholder – Sterling Rex
 Sandy Turner, chairman of the corporation meeting – J. Leubrie Hill
 Deacon Sparks – Lloyd G. Gibbs
 Jack Dimery, Uncle Apple Jack – George Catlin
 Sid Morgan, a board member – James M. Thomas
 Dick Beel, a board member – H. B. Guillaume
 Bill Hayden, a board member – Angelo Hously
 Jim Strode, a board member – Charles Hall
 Mr. White, a board member – Arthur Payne
 Abe Milum, a board member – L. H. Saulsbury
 Mr. Black, a board member – J. P. Reed
 Mr. Brown, a board member – G. Henry Tapley
 Mr. Green, a board member – Frank H. Williams
 Sleepy Jim Harper, a board member – W. H. Chapelle
 Mr. Collins, secretary of the corporation – Henry Troy
 Mose Blackstone, lawyer and founder of the T.S.C.R. Co. – Jesse A. Shipp
 Skunkton Bowser, the missing heir – Bert Williams
 Bud Jenkins, Bon Bon Buddie – George Walker
 
 Fred Lewis, nephew of Fountain Lewis – Henry Troy
 Members of the entertainment, Finance and Decoration Committees: Misses Guiguesse, Clough, Jordan, Bluford, Ellis, Payne, Fowler, Young, Martin, M. Brown, L. Brown and Banks.
 Doc Foster, a conjurer – Lavinia Rogers
 Doc Foster, a conjurer – J. Francis Mores
 Jim Harper Jr. – Ada Vaughan

Musical numbers
Song list from IBDB.

Act 1
"Corn Song" - Mandy Lou, Male Quartette and Chorus
"Kinky" - (lyrics by Mord Allen)	Dinah Simmons and Kinky Girls
"'Tain't Gwine to Be No Rain" - Amos Simmons and Male Chorus
"Exhortation" - Deacon Sparks and Male Chorus
"Until Then" - Skunkton Bowser, Bud Jenkins and Male Chorus

ACT 2
"Minuet" - Mose Blackstone
"Red, Red Rose" (lyrics by Alex Rogers) - Mandy Lou
"When I Was Sweet Sixteen" (music by J. Leubrie Hill; lyrics by Mord Allen) - Angelina Diggs
"It's Hard to Love Somebody" (When Your Somebody Don't Love You) (music by Chris Smith; lyrics by Cecil Mack) - Dinah Simmons
"Just the Same"	
"Somewhere" (music by Joe Jordan and Frank H. Williams; lyrics by Joe Jordan and Frank H. Williams) - Mr. Collins and Chorus
"Late Hours" (music by Bert A. Williams; lyrics by David Kempner) - Mose Blackstone
"Bon Bon Buddie" (lyrics by Alex Rogers) - Bud Jenkins

ACT 3
"Ethiopia" (music by Al Johns) - Dinah Simmons and Girls
"Me to Me Is Me" - Mose Blackstone

Production

Pre-Broadway
One of the first notices of Bandanna Land is in a two-line notice in Billboard dated July 1, 1905. The notice, part of an assemblage of "notes and gossip of Chicago and the Northwest," says that the show as well as "Absinthe Frappe" are "winning many laurels."

By 1907 Williams and Walker began working up the show based on the vaudeville act.  A May 1907 notice has Williams and Walker performing a twenty-minute skit called On the Road to Bandanna Land at the Chesnut Theatre in Philadelphia. The review mentions songs such as "Friend of the Family," "A Cousin of Mine," and "Just One Word of Consolation," none of which made it into the version produced on Broadway nine months later. 

By the end of the summer the show began a four-month pre-Broadway tour, starting September 1907 and lasting through the beginning of February 1908: 

September 12, 1907: Collingwood Opera House in Poughkeepsie, N.Y.
September 13: Rand's Opera House in Troy, N.Y.
October 1: Colonial Theatre in Akron, Ohio
October 9: Danville, Illinois
October 10: Champaign, Illinois
October 11: Springfield, Illinois
October 12: Quincy, Illinois
October 13–19: Kansas City, Missouri  
October 20: Leavenworth, Kansas
October 21–22: St. Joseph, Missouri
October 23: Topeka, Kansas
October 24: Lawrence, Kansas
October 25: Joplin, Missouri

October 26: Sedalia, Missouri
October 2-November 9: St. Louis, Missouri
November 10–30: Chicago, Illinois
December 1–7: Milwaukee, Wisconsin 
December 8–14: Louisville, Kentucky
December 15–21: Cincinnati, Ohio
December 23: Bijou in Pittsburgh, Pennsylvania,
December 29-January 1, 1908: Toledo, Ohio
January 2–4: Grand Rapids, Michigan 
January 6–11: Detroit, Michigan
January 13–18: Toronto, Ontario, Canada
January 20-February 2: Philadelphia, Pennsylvania

Broadway
After touring the east coast, Bandanna Land opened on Broadway at the Majestic Theatre in New York City on February 3, 1908. It ran for 89 performances, closing on April 18, 1908.

Post-Broadway
Following its close on Broadway, Bandanna Land played at the Majestic Theatre in Brooklyn from April 20 until about May 30.

While Williams and Walker were performing in London in July 1908, there was talk of a London production of Bandanna Land. Instead, the duo performed The Guardian and the Heir, "a boiled-down version" of Bandanna Land.

Back on American soil, Bandanna Land opened August 14, 1908 at the "Grand Opera House".

It played a special engagement at the Academy of Music in Baltimore, Maryland.

For the week of April 5, 1909, the show returned to the Majestic Theatre in Brooklyn, N.Y.

In February 1909, Bandanna Land played at the "Masonic Theater" in Louisville, Kentucky.  The run was so successful that potential attendees had to be turned away.  During the run George Walker became ill (an illness which eventually led to his death).  He left the company on February 24, 1910.  His departure ended Bandanna Land'''s run as well as the partnership of Williams and Walker.

Critical reception
During the pre-Broadway tour, one critic wrote "Williams and Walker have a vehicle which is making them popular, and incidentally, some of the much-needed mazuma. Their eccentric style of character-drawing produced what is, no doubt, the highest type of negro achievement on the stage to-day. The company is made up of some clever people."Billboard's unnamed reviewer wrote: "In the first act there is a meeting of a corporation, which is so finished in every detail of costuming, grouping and by-play, that it is only after the fall of the curtain, that you realize how much has gone into its current presentment...If Belasco could get half the atmosphere into a production that Bandanna Land produces in such abundance, he would be rejoiced."

The review in Variety began: "'Bandanna Land' is a real artistic achievement, representing as it does a distinct advancement in negro minstrelsy. Realizing, perhaps, that the white public is chronically disinclined to accept the stage negro in any but a purely comedy vein and having at the same time a natural desire to be something better than the conventional colored clown whose class mark is a razor and an ounce or two of cut glass, Williams and Walker have approached the delicate subject from a new side....'Bandanna Land' has found substantial success at the Majestic Theatre, where it is now in its fourth week with an almost unbroken record of capacity business. No small part of the credit for this result is due to Will Marion Cook, who wrote the music, and to the splendid singing organization.The score is full of surprises, crisp little phrases that stick in the mind and are distinctly whistleable, and several of the lyrics that go with them are excellently done."

The unnamed author of the brief New York Times'' review wrote that Walker and Williams would have been positively received if they had done only the cakewalk and dance that concluded act 2. The reviewer wrote that the conclusion of the cakewalk received a "response from the audience that was utterfly deafening" and had to be encored thirteen times." The critic noted that, in act 1, the land corporation "with a very big name" was set up like a minstrel show, with the corporation's president functioning as an interlocuter and two board members as end men.

Notes and references

Notes

References

External links

1908 musicals
All-Black cast Broadway shows
Broadway musicals